Marie-Élisabeth Noblet (24 November 1801 in Paris – September 1852 in Paris), known by her stage name of Lise Noblet, was a French ballet dancer. She débuted at the Ballet de l'Opéra de Paris in 1819 in a pas de deux with Albert, then danced the principal roles in the ballets of Pierre Gardel. She left the Opéra in 1841 on the death of her faithful companion, général Claparède.

She created the title role of Fenella in the opera La muette de Portici by Daniel Auber.  The role of Alphonse in that opera was created by Alexis Dupont, who married Lise Noblet's sister Félicité Noblet.  She was also a ballerina, and appeared under her husband's name, Alexis Dupont.

1801 births
1852 deaths
French ballerinas
Musicians from Paris
Noblet